"Full Of Smoke" is a song by American R&B duo Christión. It was released as the first single of their debut studio album Ghetto Cyrano, with the record labels Roc-A-Fella Records and Def Jam Recordings. The song peaked at number 53 on the Billboard Hot 100, their highest charting single to date.

Track listing 
12" single
Side A
Full Of Smoke (Radio Edit) — 3:33
Full Of Smoke (Instrumental) — 3:50
Side B
Aftermath (LP Version) — 3:55
Full Of Smoke (LP Version) — 3:50
Full Of Smoke (Acappella) — 3:50

Charts

References

1997 singles
Def Jam Recordings singles
Roc-A-Fella Records singles
1996 songs